Atomopteryx is a genus of moths of the family Crambidae.

Species
Atomopteryx coelodactyla (Zeller, 1863)
Atomopteryx doeri Walsingham, 1891
Atomopteryx erschoffiana (Zeller, 177)
Atomopteryx incalis (Hampson, 1913)
Atomopteryx perelongata (Hampson, 1913)
Atomopteryx peruviana (Zeller, 1877)
Atomopteryx pterophoralis (Walker, 1866)
Atomopteryx serpentifera (Hampson, 1913)
Atomopteryx solanalis 
Atomopteryx unicolor (E. Hering, 1906)

References

Spilomelinae
Crambidae genera
Taxa named by Thomas de Grey, 6th Baron Walsingham